Kevin Verity is an English former football player and manager.

Career

Playing career
Verity, who played as a striker, began his career at Halifax Town, scoring 6 goals in 13 appearances in the Football League between 1958 and 1960. He later played non-League football with Ilkeston Town.

Coaching career
Verity manager of the Trinidad and Tobago national team between November 1972 and December 1973.

Personal life
His brother Dave was also a professional footballer.

References

1930s births
Living people
English footballers
English football managers
English expatriate football managers
Halifax Town A.F.C. players
Ilkeston Town F.C. (1945) players
English Football League players
Trinidad and Tobago national football team managers
Expatriate football managers in Trinidad and Tobago
English expatriate sportspeople in Trinidad and Tobago
Association football forwards